John or Jack Welch may refer to:
John Welch (colonial administrator), 18th-century governor of Anguilla
John Welch (politician) (1805–1891), U.S. representative from Ohio
John Welch (architect) (fl. 1880s), Brooklyn-based church architect
Jack Welch (illustrator) (1905–1985), American illustrator
Johnny Welch (1906–1940), baseball player
John J. Welch Jr. (1930–2010), U.S. Assistant Secretary of the Air Force (Acquisition) 1987–1992
Jack Welch (1935–2020), American business executive and former CEO of General Electric
John W. Welch (born 1946), scholar and Brigham Young University professor
 John Welch (basketball) (born 1963), assistant coach for the Sacramento Kings
 Jack Welch (American football) (fl. 1980s–2010s), former head football coach Kansas Wesleyan University Coyotes
Jack Welch (field hockey) (born 1997), Australian field hockey player
 Jack Welch, referee who made the controversial Mexican Joe Rivers call
 Jack Welch (admiral) (1941–2014), Chief of Navy (New Zealand)

See also
Jonathon Welch (born 1958), Australian choral conductor
Jack Welsh (disambiguation)
John Welsh (disambiguation)